Wattle Ridge is a locality in the Southern Highlands of New South Wales, Australia, in Wingecarribee Shire. It is located near Buxton and Balmoral. 

At the 2021 census, no people were recorded as residents of Wattle Ridge.

References

Towns of the Southern Highlands (New South Wales)
Wingecarribee Shire